Charles Geerts may refer to:

 Charles Geerts (businessman) (born 1943), Dutch brothel owner
 Charles Geerts (footballer) (1930–2015), Belgian footballer